John Michael Callahan (February 5, 1951 – July 24, 2010) was an American cartoonist, artist, and musician in Portland, Oregon.

Accident and career
Callahan became a quadriplegic in an auto accident as a passenger in 1972.
The accident happened in Callahan's car which was being driven by a man he did not know too well.

Following his accident, he became a cartoonist, drawing by clutching a pen between both hands, having regained partial use of his upper body. His visual artistic style was simple and often rough, although still legible. 

Callahan's cartoons dealt with subjects often considered taboo, including disabilities and disease. His black humor may be exemplified by the title of his "quasi-memoir," Will the Real John Callahan Please Stand Up? The subject matter and treatment of his cartoons share something with the work of Charles Addams, Gahan Wilson, and especially Charles Rodrigues, although it is much more aggressive than even the Playboy cartoons by these cartoonists.

From 1983 until his death 27 years later, Callahan's work appeared in the Portland newspaper Willamette Week. The controversial nature of his cartoons occasionally led to boycotts and protests against the paper.

Callahan scoffed at the reactions of critics who labeled his work politically incorrect, while delighting in the positive reactions he received from fans with disabilities. "My only compass for whether I've gone too far is the reaction I get from people in wheelchairs, or with hooks for hands." Callahan said. "Like me, they are fed up with people who presume to speak for the disabled. All the pity and the patronizing. That's what is truly detestable."

Two animated cartoon series have been based on Callahan's cartoons, both produced by the Canada-based Nelvana: Pelswick (on CBC Television) and Quads! (on Teletoon).

Friends said Callahan realized that his cartooning was a form of emotional venting, which led him to pursue a master's degree in counseling at Portland State University. However, his deteriorating health prevented him from finishing his first term.

In 2005, Dutch filmmaker Simone de Vries directed a documentary about Callahan titled Raak me waar ik voelen kan (English: Touch Me Where I Can Feel).

Callahan died on July 24, 2010, following surgery for chronic bed sores. His brother stated the causes of his death were complications of quadriplegia and respiratory problems. He was 59 years old.

A biographical film, Don't Worry, He Won't Get Far on Foot based on Callahan's memoir of the same name, was posthumously released in 2018.

Other careers

Graphic art
Callahan worked on nudes and a portrait project, which was shown in several galleries throughout its progression.

Songwriting
Callahan was also a songwriter. He released a CD, Purple Winos in the Rain, in 2006. He wrote and composed his own lyrics, and sang and played the harmonica and ukulele. The record was released on BoneClone Records and produced by blues musician Terry Robb, who also plays guitar accompaniment on several tracks, with a special cameo appearance by Tom Waits. Callahan personally illustrated the album cover. Posthumously, in 2018, track 14, "Texas When You Go," a duet recording of Callahan and Robb, was included in the film score for Don't Worry, He Won't Get Far on Foot.

The Independent called his songs "beautiful, but dark." He wrote all the music and lyrics himself and was backed up by many notable musicians. A Dutch film crew recorded the studio sessions in which Callahan played a simplified piano version of "Roll Away the Day."

Personal life
John Callahan was adopted as an infant and grew up in The Dalles. His adoptive parents later had five biological children. He attended a Roman Catholic elementary school, St Mary's Academy, and graduated from a public high school.  According to his memoir, Don't Worry, He Won't Get Far on Foot, the nun, Sister Joseph of Mary, chose him as her surrogate child and insisted he sit with her at recess and not play with the other children, constantly telling him how special he was. In his book, Callahan said, "I can imagine myself sitting on that bench and thinking Boy, this will be called child molestation twenty years from now." He began drinking at the age of 12. "I used the alcohol to hide the pain of the abuse," Callahan said. After the car accident that caused his spinal cord injury, he went through extensive rehabilitation. At the age of 27, he gave up drinking alcohol. He made his home in Portland, Oregon.

References

External links

Scene Missing Magazine Interviews John Callahan
Glide Magazine reviews Callahan performance at Edgefield w/My Morning Jacket

1951 births
2010 deaths
American cartoonists
American male singer-songwriters
American harmonica players
American ukulele players
Album-cover and concert-poster artists
American humorists
American memoirists
American adoptees
Artists with disabilities
People with tetraplegia
Artists from Portland, Oregon
Musicians from Portland, Oregon
American male non-fiction writers
Deaths from respiratory failure
Writers from Portland, Oregon